Sarcohyla sabrina, also known as the Sierra Juarez treefrog, is a species of frog in the family Hylidae. It is endemic to the northern slopes of Sierra de Juárez in northern Oaxaca, Mexico. The specific name sabrina is Latin for river nymph and refers to the close association of this species with streams.

Description
Sarcohyla sabrina is a small, slender-limbed frog. Males measure  and females  in snout–vent length. The tympanum is absent. The fingers lack webbing whereas the toes are about three-fourths webbed. The dorsum is light chocolate brown with mostly green and some dark brown mottling. There is a dark brown stripe running from nostril along the canthus to back of arm. At night, they might be a bright leaf green. Breeding males do not have nuptial spines.

Habitat and conservation
It occurs along streams in moist and rocky habitats with abundant aquatic vegetation.

The population of Sarcohyla sabrina is declining. It is threatened by habitat loss and chytridiomycosis.

References

Endemic amphibians of Mexico
Fauna of the Sierra Madre de Oaxaca
Critically endangered animals
Amphibians described in 1974
Taxonomy articles created by Polbot
Taxa named by Janalee P. Caldwell
sabrina